Josh Chambers (born 13 November 2003) is an English professional footballer who plays as a midfielder for  club Gillingham.

Career
Chambers was a second-year scholar when he was involved with the Gillingham first-team in February 2022, becoming the fifth youngest player in the club's history to be named in a first-team squad. He made his EFL League One debut on 12 March, after coming on as a 75th-minute substitute for Charlie Kelman in a 1–0 win at Doncaster Rovers. He won his first start on 2 April, in a 1–0 defeat at Sunderland; manager Neil Harris said that "he's got real personality and character. That's why I played him". He appeared to have left the club after rejecting a new contract offer and trialling with Tottenham Hotspur at the end of the 2021–22 season. However, he eventually signed a new contract in September 2022. On 6 November 2022, he joined Worthing of the National League South on a short-term loan deal. He impressed manager Adam Hinshelwood, who said he would and try to extend the teenager's loan deal. In January 2023 it was confirmed that Gillingham had agreed to extend his loan until the end of the 2022–23 season.

Career statistics

References

2003 births
Living people
Footballers from Greater London
English footballers
Association football midfielders
Gillingham F.C. players
Worthing F.C. players
English Football League players
National League (English football) players